Kores may refer to:

 Kores (company)
 Art Kores (1886–1974), American professional baseball player
 Goris, Syunik, Armenia, also known as Kores

See also
 Kore (disambiguation)